Pauline Prochazka (1842–1930) was the founder of the Water Colour Society of Ireland.

Life

Baroness Pauline Prochazka was the daughter of Ottokar, Baron Prochazka, Field Marshal Lieutenant in the Austrian Army, and Leopoldine Henrika Gersch, step-daughter of the late Baron Stuart de Decies, of Dromana, County Waterford. Although born in Prague, she left Bohemia very young and was brought up in Ireland.

She founded the Water Colour Society of Ireland in 1870 with a group of six women in Waterford. It was founded initially as the Amateur Drawing Society.  Eight years later it was renamed to the "Irish Fine Art Society".

Prochazka was an accomplished and award-winning water-colourist and became manager of the Royal Irish School of Art Needlework in 1886. She ran the school for twelve years.

She was a niece to Sir Charles Wheeler Cuffe and thus related to the illustrator Charlotte, Lady Wheeler-Cuffe. She lived in Lyrath house in County Kilkenny. Her death was announced in the Irish Times of April 24, 1930.

References

1930 deaths
1842 births
Irish women painters
20th-century Irish painters
19th-century Irish women artists
20th-century Irish women artists
19th-century Irish painters